Cecil Armillo Partee (April 10, 1921 – August 17, 1994) was an American attorney and politician. He was the first African American to serve as president of the Illinois Senate and the first to serve as Cook County State's Attorney. He served in both the Illinois House of Representatives and the Illinois State Senate. He also served three terms as City Treasurer of Chicago.

Early life and education
Born in Blytheville, Arkansas, Partee received his bachelor's degree from Tennessee State University and his J.D. degree from Northwestern University School of Law in 1946.

Political career

Illinois State House 
He practiced law and was an assistant state's attorney. In 1956, he was elected to the Illinois House of Representatives as a Democrat. As a member of the House, he served on a special House committee on reapportionment, as chairman of an interim legislative committee that set up the Illinois Fair Employment Practices Commission, and as chairman of the House Elections Committee.

While in the House, Partee sponsored fair housing legislation. He was also a leader in pursuing fair employment practices legislation.

Illinois State Senate 
In 1966, he was elected to the Illinois State Senate. In 1975, he was elected as President of the Illinois Senate, becoming the first black person to serve in that role and the first to head a state legislature anywhere in the United States since the end of Reconstruction.

He ran for Illinois Attorney General in 1976 and won the Democratic Party nomination, but lost the general election to Republican William Scott.

20th Ward Committeeman 
During the 1970s, Partee served as Democratic Party committeeman for Chicago's 20th ward. He was credited in his Chicago Tribune obituary for playing an important role in helping Harold Washington win a close election for State Representative while in this position.

City Treasurer of Chicago 
In 1979, he successfully ran for City Treasurer of Chicago. He won re-election twice and served in the office until 1989.

Cook County State's Attorney 
Partee was appointed State Attorney for Cook County on April 24, 1989, when Richard M. Daley was elected Mayor of Chicago. He was the first black person to serve in this office, and the last until Kim Foxx in 2016. He lost a special election for the office to Republican candidate Jack O'Malley on November 6, 1990.

Death
Partee died of lung cancer in Chicago on August 17, 1994.

References

External links
Richard J. Daley Library-Cecil Armillo Partee papers

1921 births
1994 deaths
African-American state legislators in Illinois
Democratic Party Illinois state senators
Democratic Party members of the Illinois House of Representatives
District attorneys in Illinois
Politicians from Chicago
Illinois lawyers
Northwestern University Pritzker School of Law alumni
Tennessee State University alumni
People from Blytheville, Arkansas
20th-century American lawyers
20th-century African-American politicians
20th-century American politicians
African-American lawyers